Cyclooxygenase 1 (COX-1), also known as prostaglandin G/H synthase 1, prostaglandin-endoperoxide synthase 1 or prostaglandin H2 synthase 1, is an enzyme that in humans is encoded by the PTGS1 gene. In humans it is one of two cyclooxygenases.

History 
Cyclooxygenase (COX) is the central enzyme in the biosynthetic pathway to prostaglandins from arachidonic acid. This protein was isolated more than 40 years ago and cloned in 1988.

Gene and isozymes 
There are two isozymes of COX encoded by distinct gene products: a constitutive COX-1 (this enzyme) and an inducible COX-2, which differ in their regulation of expression and tissue distribution. The expression of these two transcripts is differentially regulated by relevant cytokines and growth factors. This gene encodes COX-1, which regulates angiogenesis in endothelial cells. COX-1 is also involved in cell signaling and maintaining tissue homeostasis. A splice variant of COX-1 termed COX-3 was identified in the central nervous system of dogs, but does not result in a functional protein in humans. Two smaller COX-1-derived proteins (the partial COX-1 proteins PCOX-1A and PCOX-1B) have also been discovered, but their precise roles are yet to be described.

Function 
Prostaglandin-endoperoxide synthase (PTGS), also known as cyclooxygenase (COX), is the key enzyme in prostaglandin biosynthesis. It converts free arachidonic acid, released from membrane phospholipids at the sn-2 ester binding site by the enzymatic activity of phospholipase A2, to prostaglandin (PG) H2. The reaction involves both cyclooxygenase (dioxygenase) and hydroperoxidase (peroxidase) activity. The cyclooxygenase activity incorporates two oxygen molecules into arachidonic acid or alternate polyunsaturated fatty acid substrates, such as linoleic acid and eicosapentaenoic acid. Metabolism of arachidonic acid forms a labile intermediate peroxide, PGG2, which is reduced to the corresponding alcohol, PGH2, by the enzyme's hydroperoxidase activity.

While metabolizing arachidonic acid primarily to PGG2, COX-1 also converts this fatty acid to small amounts of a racemic mixture of 15-Hydroxyicosatetraenoic acids (i.e., 15-HETEs) composed of ~22% 15(R)-HETE and ~78% 15(S)-HETE stereoisomers as well as a small amount of 11(R)-HETE. The two 15-HETE stereoisomers have intrinsic biological activities but, perhaps more importantly, can be further metabolized to a major class of anti-inflammatory agents, the lipoxins. In addition, PGG2 and PGH2 rearrange non-enzymatically to a mixture of 12-Hydroxyheptadecatrienoic acids viz.,1 2-(S)-hydroxy-5Z,8E,10E-heptadecatrienoic acid (i.e. 12-HHT) and 12-(S)-hydroxy-5Z,8Z,10E-heptadecatrienoic acid plus Malonyldialdehyde. and can be metabolized by CYP2S1 to 12-HHT (see 12-Hydroxyheptadecatrienoic acid). These alternate metabolites of COX-1 may contribute to its activities.

COX-1 promotes the production of the natural mucus lining that protects the inner stomach and contributes to reduced acid secretion and reduced pepsin content. COX-1 is normally present in a variety of areas of the body, including not only the stomach but any site of inflammation.

Clinical significance 
COX-1 is inhibited by nonsteroidal anti-inflammatory drugs (NSAIDs) such as aspirin. Thromboxane A2, the major product of COX-1 in platelets, induces platelet aggregation. The inhibition of COX-1 is sufficient to explain why low dose aspirin is effective at reducing cardiac events.

See also 
 Arachidonic acid
 Cyclooxygenase
 Cyclooxygenase 2
 NSAID
 Discovery and development of COX-2 selective inhibitors
 COX-2 selective inhibitor

References

Further reading 

 
 
 
 
 
 
 
 
 
 
 
 
 
 
 
 
 
 
 

Prostaglandins
Peripheral membrane proteins